Savage is a Canadian short film, directed by Lisa Jackson and released in 2009.

The film depicts a Cree woman (Skeena Reece) crying and singing a sad traditional song while a young girl (Ta'Kaiya Blaney) is transported to an Indian residential school (although the film is deliberately ambiguous about whether the woman is the child's mother, or the child herself reflecting on her past as an adult.) At the school, however, the conventional narrative of Indian residential schools is subverted when the children perform a hip hop–inspired group dance routine in class after the teacher leaves the room.

Accolades
The film won the Genie Award for Best Live Action Short Drama at the 31st Genie Awards.

References

External links
 

2009 films
Canadian musical drama films
Best Live Action Short Drama Genie and Canadian Screen Award winners
First Nations films
2000s musical drama films
2009 drama films
Works about residential schools in Canada
2000s English-language films
Canadian drama short films
2000s Canadian films
English-language Canadian films